Jarmo Kytölehto (born 23 June 1961) is a Finnish former rally driver from Petäjävesi. He won the Finnish Rally Championship in three consecutive years, first in Group A (1990, 1991) and then in Group N (1992). He also competed in 23 events in the World Rally Championship, with his best results coming in his home event at Rally Finland where he finished on the podium in 1995, 1996 and 1997. He competed in the British Rally Championship from 1995 until 2000, driving for several works Formula 2 teams, including Vauxhall, Ford and Hyundai.

External links
Profile of Kytölehto, Rallybase.nl
Profile of Kytölehto , Rallye-info.com
Profile of Kytölehto , Rally Paradise

1961 births
Living people
People from Petäjävesi
Finnish rally drivers
World Rally Championship drivers
Sportspeople from Central Finland